2008 AFC U-16 Championship qualification was the qualification for the 2008 AFC U-16 Championship football competition.  The matches were held from 1 October to 7 November 2007.

The draw for the qualification stages was made on 22 December 2006 in Kuala Lumpur, seven groups with six teams and one group with three teams were made. However Afghanistan, the Philippines, Timor-Leste, the Maldives and Myanmar withdrew before the start of the qualification.

On 18 February 2008, the AFC Disciplinary Committee ejected eight teams for fielding overage players, including DPR Korea, Tajikistan and Iraq, who had originally qualified for the AFC U-16 Championship 2008.

The winners and runners-up of Groups A–G along with the winner of the three-team Group H qualified for the finals. Hosts Uzbekistan also qualified automatically for the finals, after qualified by its own performances during the qualification.

Groups

Group A

All matches were held in Qatar.
Times listed are UTC+3.

Group B

All matches were held in Iran.
Times listed are UTC+3:30.

Group C

All matches were held in Saudi Arabia.
Times listed are UTC+3.

Group D

All matches were held in United Arab Emirates.
Times listed are UTC+4.

Group E

 All matches in Hebei Province, China
 Times listed are UTC+8

Group F

 All matches in Jakarta, Indonesia
 Times listed are UTC+7

Group G

 All matches in Singapore
 Times listed are UTC+8

Group H

 All matches in Bangkok, Thailand
 Times listed are UTC+7

Countries to participate in 2008 AFC U-16 Championship

References

External links
Details on AFC.com
Details on Goalzz.com

Qual
AFC U-16 Championship qualification
Qualification